Fulgoraria ericarum is a species of sea snail, a marine gastropod mollusk in the family Volutidae, the volutes.

Description
The length of the shell attains 141.4 mm.

Distribution
This marine species occurs off Vietnam.

References

 Douté, H., 1997. A new species of Fulgoraria from Vietnam. La Conchiglia 284: 20-22

Volutidae
Gastropods described in 1997